Pilgerbach is a  river of north Hesse, Germany, in the district of Edermünde. It is a westerly tributary of the Eder into which it flows near Edermünde-Grifte, just before the Eder flows into the Fulda. The name Pilgerbach can be translated in English as Pilgrim's stream.

Course 
The Pilgerbach rises in the nature park of the Habichtswald near Kassel. The spring is on the eastern flank of the  Benberg hill and the northern flank of the  Bilstein hill, ca.  northwest of Besse.

After leaving the forest, the river flows through arable land to the south-west of Besse, before it passes the westerly and southern parts of the same town and leaves the nature park. At this point the Saugraben tributary meets the Pilgerbach from the west. As it flows further eastwards it passes mainly arable and pasture land. Next to the L3221 road it reaches the basalt knoll Hahn before passing through Edermünde-Holzhausen. On the western edge of this village it meets the Glisborn tributary, which comes from the southwest. After passing under the Autobahn A49 it meets the tributary of the Hertingshausener Bach, and flows next to the L3221 road to the town of Grifte. In this village it flows partly through tunnels and canals. After passing under the railway track, just to the east of Grifte, it flows in to the Eder river, which in turn flows in the Fulda in just  further on.

See also
List of rivers of Hesse

Rivers of Hesse
Rivers of Germany